Never Let Her Go is the second solo album by David Gates of the American soft rock band Bread.

Track listing
All songs written and arranged by David Gates.

"Never Let Her Go" – 03:09
"Angel" – 2:28
"Playin' on My Guitar" – 2:47
"Watch Out" – 2:05
"Part Time Love" – 2:23
"Chain Me" – 1:57
"Light of My Life" – 2:18
"Someday" – 2:02
"Greener Days" – 3:36
"Strangers" – 4:02

Personnel
David Gates - Guitar, Vocals

References

1975 albums
David Gates albums
Elektra Records albums